William or Bill Renwick may refer to:
 Bill Renwick (1929–2013), New Zealand educationalist
 William Renwick (politician) (1915–1981), member of the Pennsylvania House of Representatives
 William Lindsay Renwick (1889–1970), professor of English Literature 
 William Renwick (rugby union) (1914–1944), Scottish rugby union player